This is a list of electoral district results of the 2017 Western Australian election.

Percentages, margins and swings are calculated on notional estimates based on analysis of the redistributed electoral boundaries by the ABC's Antony Green.

Statewide Results

Results by electoral district

Albany

Armadale

Balcatta

Baldivis

Bassendean

Bateman

Belmont

Bicton

Bunbury

Burns Beach

Butler

Cannington

Carine

Central Wheatbelt

Churchlands

Cockburn

Collie-Preston

Cottesloe

Darling Range

Dawesville

Forrestfield

Fremantle

Geraldton

Girrawheen

Hillarys

Jandakot

Joondalup

Kalamunda

Kalgoorlie

Kimberley

Kingsley

Kwinana

Mandurah

Maylands

Midland

Mirrabooka

Moore

Morley

Mount Lawley

Murray-Wellington

Nedlands

North West Central

Perth

Pilbara

Riverton

Rockingham

Roe

Scarborough

South Perth

Southern River

Swan Hills

Thornlie

Vasse

Victoria Park

Wanneroo

Warnbro

Warren-Blackwood

West Swan

Willagee

References

Results of Western Australian elections
2017 elections in Australia